Vallé is a surname. Notable people with the surname include:

 Paul Vallé (1926–2004), British sprinter
 Ernest Vallé (1845–1920), French lawyer and politician
 François Vallé (1716–1783), French Canadian who became the richest man in Upper Louisiana

See also
 Valle (disambiguation)
 Vallée (disambiguation)